María Carlota Isasi-Isasmendi Paredes (born 29 September 1975) is a Spanish actress.

Isasi is the daughter of Spanish parents, film director Antonio Isasi-Isasmendi and actress Marisa Paredes. She graduated in Fine Arts and studied acting at the Juan Carlos Corazza Academy.

Trajectory 
Her filmography includes Volavérunt, by Bigas Luna; Los amantes del círculo polar, by Julio Médem; El caballero Don Quijote, by Manuel Gutiérrez Aragón; Salvajes, by Carlos Molinero, for which she was nominated to the Goya Award for Best New Actress in 2002, and Las trece rosas, by Emilio Martínez Lázaro.

She has also made some incursions into television, as in an episode of the Telecinco series Hermanos y detectives. In 2004 she participated in several episodes of the hit series Aquí no hay quien viva, asking Natalia (Sofia Nieto) as a surrogate mother. Later, she changed her mind and left Natalia with the baby, as she wanted to break her marriage and did not know what she could do with the baby. At the end of 2009 she began her career in the series of La 1 Amar en tiempos revueltos. 

She is known for her interpretation of Diana, the hairdresser of the theater commanded by the well-known actress Estela del Val (Cayetana Guillén-Cuervo). She is the best friend of Rosa (Bárbara Lennie), and is in love with Salvador Bellido Huerga (Pep Munné). She worked from October 2009 to September 2010 in the series.

For her role, small but very lucid and that gives her five minutes where she shines for her performance, she was awarded on November 2, 2010 with the Ojo Crítico de Teatro Award, granted by Radio Nacional de España.

In 2011 she participated in the LaSexta series BuenAgente. In 2012 she played the lead role in the play ¡Sin paga, nadie paga! with Pablo Carbonell. Between July 2013 and April 2014 she played the role of Polixena in the Greek tragedy Hécuba by Eurípides at the Festival de Teatro Clásico de Mérida, with a subsequent tour of Spain.

She participated in the TVE series Seis Hermanas where she gives life to the character of Elpidia. Although the series began on 22 April 2015, her character, a maid in Silva's house, would arrive to the series some time later and until the end of it, on 21 April 2017. In Seis Hermanas she will be Antonia's cousin, owner of the "Ambigú" and aunt of Gabriel, the later Count of Barnos. She will also be the lover of Raimundo, the husband of Merceditas, another of the maids of Casa Silva. From this relationship she will become pregnant but the child will never be born.

She participated in the series Centro médico as Dr Angela Vega (Episode 1012 - 1167) and appeared in the final chapter number 1175) between 2018-January 2019.

On stage, she headed the cast of Comedia sin título by Federico García Lorca (2019), in a version by Alberto Conejero.

Filmography

Accolades

References

External links 
 María Isasi on IMDb

Spanish stage actresses
Spanish film actresses
1975 births
Living people